Sweeny & Co. Architects Inc. is a Canadian architecture firm founded in 1988 by architect Dermot Sweeny. The firm is based in Toronto, Canada. Sweeny & Co. Architects specializes in commercial office towers, residential buildings, and mixed-use developments.

History 
The firm was founded in 1988 by architect Dermot Sweeny. The firm's first project was The Derby, a residential building located at 393 King Street East in Toronto. The construction of The Derby constituted the city of Toronto's first re-zoning of industrial land to residential under mayor Barbara Hall's new policy in the late 1990s.

The firm completed the Microsoft Canada Headquarters in 2002 and the Loblaw Companies Headquarters in 2005.

Notable projects

Queen Richmond Centre West (2015) 

Completed in 2015, The Queen Richmond Centre West is a commercial building located at the intersection of Richmond Street West and Peter Street in Toronto, Ontario. The design of notably preserved the existing adjacent brick buildings while adding a new 12-story office tower above it. This project has won more than 16 prestigious design awards including the OAA Award for Design Excellence, RAIC National Urban Design Award for Urban Architecture, AIA's R+D Award, Canadian Green Building Award, The Toronto Urban Design Award, and The ACO Paul Oberman Award for Adaptive Reuse.

TELUS House Toronto (2009) 

Located at the heart of downtown Toronto within the Financial District, the TELUS House Toronto, is a 30-story commercial glass tower completed in October 2009. The development team of the projects includes managing partners Menkes Development Ltd., Alcion Ventures and HOOPP Realty Inc., with the collaboration of two architecture firms Sweeny&Co Architects Inc. and Adamson Associates as lead architects. The TELUS House Toronto has achieved the LEED Canada Platinum certification for Existing Buildings: Operations and Maintenance. Some of its sustainable features include advanced heating and cooling delivery through raised floor, deep-lake water cooling system, perimeter radiant panels as well as built-in blinds. The design of the building also focused on ensuring the wellness and comfort of its users by offering better access to natural light through the 11-foot floor-to-ceiling glass windows as well as individual workstation and airflow and temperature controls. The TELUS House Toronto have received multiple awards including the DC Award Bronze, Toronto Urban Design Award, OAA Award Design Excellence, BOMA Earth Award Office Building, and more.

Waterfront Innovation Centre (2021) 
The Waterfront Innovation Centre, was completed by august 2021, is a project developed by Menkes Developments and commissioned by Waterfront Toronto. This building was built on 1.12 acres of land, it has 475,000 square foot of development space and is designed to hold about 2,000 employees. The office development of the year NAIPO 2021 and Office investment deal of the year NAIPO 2021 was awarded.

Other projects

Selected Completed Portfolio
 One York and Harbour Plaza Residences (Toronto, 2017)
 Queen Richmond Centre West (Toronto, 2015)
 Red Stone Winery (Beamsville, 2015)
 RBC Centre (Toronto, 2009)
 TELUS House Toronto (Toronto, 2010)
 Microsoft Canada Headquarters (Mississauga, 2005)
 180 Duncan Mill (Toronto, 2002)
 BMW Group Canada Headquarters (Richmond Hill)
 Loblaw Companies Ltd. Headquarters (Brampton)
 11 Yorkville (Toronto)
 Portland Commons (Toronto)
 Waterfront Innovation Centre (Toronto)
 McLean Centre for Collaborative Discovery, McMaster University (Hamilton)

References 

Architecture firms of Canada